The U.S. state of Alabama is home to these known indigenous mammal species. Historically, the state's indigenous species included one armadillo species, sixteen bat species, thirteen carnivore species, six insectivore species, one opossum species, four rabbit species, twenty-two rodent species, and three ungulate species. Four of these native species have become extirpated within the state, including the American bison (Bison bison), cougar (Puma concolor), gray wolf (Canis lupus), and the elk (Cervus canadensis).

There are six known introduced mammal species in the state. These include the black rat, brown rat, fallow deer, wild boar, house mouse, and nutria. 

Human predation and habitat destruction has placed several mammal species at risk of extirpation or extinction. The Alabama Department of Conservation and Natural Resources lists the conservation status of each species within the state with a rank of lowest, low, moderate, high, and highest concern.

Armadillo

Bats

Carnivores

Eulipotyphlans

Opossum

Rabbits

Rodents

Cetaceans

Ungulates

References

Alabama
Mammals